Bialla may refer to:
 Biała Piska, a town in Poland
 Bialla, Papua New Guinea, a Papua New Guinean town where Airlink operates
 Bialla Rural LLG, a local-level government area of Papua New Guinea

See also
 Biała (disambiguation)